At the time of the creation of the new license plate format, the former Khorasan Province was given codes 12 for Mashhad, 32, 42 and 52 as reserve. However, soon after the province was divided up into three: Razavi Khorasan, North Khorasan, and South Khorasan. Therefore all codes dedicated to North Khorasan and South Khorasan were withdrawn and stored for future use in Razavi Khorasan. The reserve code 52 was assigned to South Khorasan. Qom Province's assigned reserve code 26 was assigned to North Khorasan, and Qom's reserve code 36 was assigned as a replacement for code 52 as Razavi Khorasan's reserve. The reason for this was the much slower than expected use of Qom Province's initially assigned code 16. In Razavi Khorasan, after codes 12, 32, and 42 were fully used, some time in August 2016, code 36 was also exhausted. Therefore it was decided to assign the province code 74, from Yazd Province's reserve code.

In public cars, Taxis and Governal cars the letter is always the same. But in simple cars this letter (ب) depends on the city.

12 
12 is Mashhad county and Torghabe-o-Shandiz County's code and all of the letters are for Mashhad.

32

36

42

74 

Road transport in Iran
Transportation in Razavi Khorasan Province